Colligny-Maizery is a commune in the Moselle department of eastern France. The municipality was established on 1 June 2016 and consists of the former communes of Colligny (the seat) and Maizery.

See also 
 Communes of the Moselle department

References

External links 
 

Communes of Moselle (department)
Populated places established in 2016